Sir Philip Wigham Richardson, 1st Baronet,  (26 January 1865 – 23 November 1953) was a British sport shooter and Conservative politician. He was the first son of John Wigham Richardson, the shipbuilder from Newcastle upon Tyne. He also competed at the 1908 Summer Olympics and the 1912 Summer Olympics.

Biography
Richardson was born on 26 January 1865 in Newcastle upon Tyne, the eldest son of shipbuilder John Wigham Richardson. He was educated at Rugby School and King's College, Cambridge. He joined the shipbuilding company his father had founded on Tyneside in 1859. He was made a director in 1891 and continued to be a director after the amalgamation of his company with C. S. Swan and Hunter, Ltd., to form the shipbuilding and engineering company of Swan, Hunter and Wigham Richardson. During his association with the company he travelled extensively in search of orders and continued to serve as a director after he retired from the chairmanship of the company, a position which he occupied from 1945 to 1949.

He married Rosa América Colorado from Cuba in 1891 with whom he had three children, John Edward Colorado Richardson (1892), William Wigham Richardson (1893) George Wigham Richardson (1895).  He divorced his first wife in 1897.  In 1909 he married Bertha Anne Greenley with whom he had one daughter Irene Geraldine Wigham.

Richardson competed in the 1908 Summer Olympics and 1912 Summer Olympics. In the 1908 Olympics he won a silver medal in the team military rifle event. Four years later he was 65th in the 300 metre military rifle, three positions event and 33rd in the 600 metre free rifle event. Appointed an Officer of the Order of the British Empire (OBE) in 1919, he was knighted in 1921.

Richardson was elected as Member of Parliament (MP) for Chertsey at a by-election in March 1922, and held the seat until he retired from the House of Commons at the 1931 general election. On 26 July 1929 he was created a Baronet, of Weybridge in the County of Surrey.

He led a colourful life travelling very widely around the world especially in Latin America, Africa, India and Eastern Europe.  He drove across the Sahara desert in 1937 and piloted his own light aircraft.

In 1952 he published his autobiography, It happened to me: Being the reminiscences of Sir Philip Wigham Richardson.

He died at his home in Weybridge on the night of 23 November 1953, aged 88.

References

Kidd, Charles, Williamson, David (editors). Debrett's Peerage and Baronetage (1990 edition). New York: St Martin's Press, 1990.

External links 
 
Profile

1865 births
1953 deaths
British male sport shooters
Olympic shooters of Great Britain
Shooters at the 1908 Summer Olympics
Shooters at the 1912 Summer Olympics
Olympic silver medallists for Great Britain
Conservative Party (UK) MPs for English constituencies
UK MPs 1918–1922
UK MPs 1922–1923
UK MPs 1923–1924
UK MPs 1924–1929
UK MPs 1929–1931
Baronets in the Baronetage of the United Kingdom
Olympic medalists in shooting
Medalists at the 1908 Summer Olympics
British sportsperson-politicians